Claytonia saxosa, known by the common name Brandegee's springbeauty, is a species of wildflower in the family Montiaceae.

Distribution
The wildflower is endemic to northern California and southern Oregon.
In northern California it is located on serpentine soils.
In Oregon it is located in three places on basalt soils in the Cascade-Siskiyou National Monument in southern Oregon. It is found on rocky open slopes at mid to high elevations.

Description
Claytonia saxosa is a small, compact annual herb forming clumps a few centimeters wide in rock crevices.  Serpentinite is the favored geologic substrate of this species. The leaves are small, with fleshy spatulate blades. The basal leaves and flowering stems are pink or red in color, packed densely together about the short stem that surmounts a minute, tuberous caudex.  The chromosome number of the species is 2n = 16.

Two to ten flowers emerge from the clump, each with five light pink petals under a centimeter long. The bloom period is March to May.

References

External links
 Calflora Database: Claytonia saxosa (Brandegee's springbeauty)
 Flora North America
Jepson Manual Treatment
Photo gallery

saxosa
Endemic flora of California
Flora of the Cascade Range
Flora of the Klamath Mountains
Flora of the Sierra Nevada (United States)
Plants described in 1893
Taxa named by Townshend Stith Brandegee